Pančevo Airport (Аеродром Панчево or Aerodrom Pančevo)  is an airport near the city of Pančevo, Serbia near Belgrade. The airport is mostly used for general aviation operations. It has a single grass runway 1,000 metres long and 60 metres wide.

The airport is also used by Utva Aviation Industry, a manufacturer of light sporting and training aircraft also located in Pančevo, for testing its aircraft.

History
On 15 March 1923, aircraft of the Franko-Rumen company started operations from Pančevo airport. A few days later on 25 March, services between Paris and Istanbul via Pančevo commenced, the first international flights to or from Belgrade. On 9 September the same year, the first aircraft took off on a scheduled service from Belgrade to Bucharest. This was also the first commercial night flight in the history of aviation. CFRNA (Compagnie franco-roumaine de navigation aérienne) decided that flying at night was the only way for its aircraft operating on the Paris-Belgrade-Bucharest-Istanbul service to beat the famous Orient Express train to Istanbul.

Franco-Roumaine changed its name to CIDNA (Compagnie internationale de navigation aérienne) in 1925, which used Pančevo Airport until May 1927.

See also
List of airports in Serbia

References

External links
Pančevo airport information (PDF)

Airports in Serbia
Buildings and structures in Vojvodina
Airport